Andohapatsakana is a city in Madagascar in the province of Fianarantsoa.

Nearby cities
Ianakoano (0.9 nm)
Ambohitsanakisa (2.0 nm)
Andalona (3.7 nm)
Tsinirahana (3.9 nm)
Valanary (1.4 nm)
Ambohipo (3.0 nm)
Ambodilandy (3.5 nm)

Nature conservation in Madagascar
Fianarantsoa Province
Populated places in Fianarantsoa Province
Cities in Madagascar